Zoe is an instrumental by Italian electronic musician Paganini Traxx. It peaked at #47 on the UK Singles Chart.

References

1997 singles
1997 songs
Song articles with missing songwriters